Nicole Vallario (born 30 August 2001) is a Swiss ice hockey defenseman and member of the Swiss national team, currently playing college ice hockey in the Western Collegiate Hockey Association (WCHA) conference of the NCAA Division I with the St. Thomas Tommies women's ice hockey program of the University of St. Thomas in Minnesota. She previously played in the Swiss Women's League (SWHL A) with HC Thurgau Ladies and HC Ladies Lugano.

Vallario represented Switzerland in the women's ice hockey tournament at the 2022 Winter Olympics in Beijing and at the IIHF Women's World Championship in 2019, 2021, and 2022. As a junior player with the Swiss national under-18 team, she participated in the IIHF U18 Women's World Championship in 2016, 2017, 2018, and 2019. She won a bronze medal with the Swiss under-16 team in the girls' ice hockey tournament at the 2016 Winter Youth Olympics in Lillehammer.

References

External links
 
 

2001 births
Living people
Ice hockey players at the 2022 Winter Olympics
Ice hockey players at the 2016 Winter Youth Olympics
Olympic ice hockey players of Switzerland
Sportspeople from Lugano
St. Thomas (Minnesota) Tommies women's ice hockey players
Swiss expatriate ice hockey people
Swiss women's ice hockey defencemen
Swiss Women's League players
Youth Olympic bronze medalists for Switzerland